Runar Espejord (born 26 February 1996) is a Norwegian footballer who plays as a striker for Bodø/Glimt.

On 20 December 2019 it was announced that he will join Heerenveen for 2,5 years on 1 January 2020. On 22 September 2020, he rejoined Tromsø on loan until the 31 December 2020.

Espejord was born in Tromsø as a son of former Tromsø player Lars Espejord.

Career statistics

Club

References

1996 births
Living people
Sportspeople from Tromsø
Norwegian footballers
Norway under-21 international footballers
Norway youth international footballers
Association football forwards
SC Heerenveen players
Tromsø IL players
FK Bodø/Glimt players
Eredivisie players
Eliteserien players
Norwegian First Division players
Norwegian expatriate footballers
Expatriate footballers in the Netherlands
Norwegian expatriate sportspeople in the Netherlands